Limnomermis is a genus of nematodes belonging to the family Mermithidae.

Species:
 Limnomermis acauda Rubzov, 1973

References

Mermithidae